Paul Mead Doty (June 1, 1920 – December 5, 2011) was Mallinckrodt Professor of Biochemistry at Harvard University, specializing in the physical properties of macromolecules and strongly involved in peace and security policy issues.

Biography
Doty was born in Charleston, West Virginia. He graduated from Penn State University in 1941 and took his doctorate from Columbia University under Joseph Edward Mayer. From 1943-45, he was at the Polytechnic Institute of Brooklyn. He joined the chemistry department Harvard University in 1948, became a member of the American Academy of Arts and Sciences in 1951, and became a member of the National Academy of Sciences in 1957. In 1954, he helped to recruit James Watson to the Harvard Biolabs, the home of the Biology Department, as an assistant professor.

In 1960, while working in Doty's lab, Julius Marmur discovered the reversible hybridization of DNA. Doty later helped to found the Department of Biochemistry and Molecular Biology and became its first chairman in 1968. His scientific work involved the characterization of biopolymers such as DNA, proteins and collagen by optical methods such as circular dichroism and light scattering. In his 42 years at Harvard, he supervised the research of 44 students, 10 of whom have been elected to the National Academy of Sciences.

As a graduate student, he worked on the Manhattan project, which led to his lifelong involvement in activities aiming to avert nuclear war. He was a special assistant to the president for national security and member of the President's Science and Arms Control Advisory Committees and in 1973 was a founder and director emeritus of the Belfer Center for Science and International Affairs at Harvard.

He was a member of the board of the Bulletin of the Atomic Scientists. He was involved for many years in the Pugwash Conferences. He was also a member of the American Philosophical Society. After retirement he continued to work on Russian-American scientific relations and was board member of George Soros' International Science Foundation that provided support to Russian scientists in the 1990s.

Awards 
1956 ACS Award in Pure Chemistry

References

External links 
Oral history interview transcript with Paul Doty in December 2004, American Institute of Physics, Niels Bohr Library & Archives
Paul Doty biodata, Harvard Kennedy School's Belfer Center website

1920 births
2011 deaths
Polymer scientists and engineers
Members of the United States National Academy of Sciences
American physical chemists
Pennsylvania State University alumni
Columbia University alumni
Harvard University faculty
American anti–nuclear weapons activists
Educators from Charleston, West Virginia
Scientists from West Virginia
Polytechnic Institute of New York University faculty
Members of the American Philosophical Society